The Kemper County School District is a public school district based in De Kalb, Mississippi, United States. The district's boundaries parallel that of Kemper County.

Schools
Kemper County High School (De Kalb; Grades 7-12)
East Kemper Elementary School (Scooba; Grades PK-6)
West Kemper Elementary School (De Kalb; Grades PK-6)

Demographics

2006-07 school year
There were a total of 1,321 students enrolled in the Kemper County School District during the 2006–2007 school year. The gender makeup of the district was 49% female and 51% male. The racial makeup of the district was 98.03% African American, 1.59% White, 0.23% Hispanic, and 0.15% Native American. 81.5% of the district's students were eligible to receive free lunch.

Previous school years

Accountability statistics

See also

List of school districts in Mississippi

References

External links

Education in Kemper County, Mississippi
School districts in Mississippi